The discography of Faith No More, an American rock group, consists of seven studio albums, nineteen singles, one live album, five compilations, four video albums.

Faith No More's first album was We Care a Lot, released by Mordam Records in 1985. The band soon signed with Slash Records and released Introduce Yourself, their second album, in April 1987. Shortly afterwards the rest of the band fired the vocalist, Chuck Mosley, and replaced him with Mike Patton. During the tour supporting their third album, The Real Thing, Faith No More recorded their only live album, Live at the Brixton Academy, and released their first hit single, "Epic". Their fourth studio album Angel Dust was released in 1992 with their final two number-one singles, "Midlife Crisis", and the Lionel Richie cover "Easy", not included on the initial release of the album. Following the tour supporting Angel Dust and the departure of long-time guitarist Jim Martin Faith No More released their fifth studio album, King for a Day... Fool for a Lifetime, in 1995. Their final studio album until 2015, Album of the Year, released on June 3, 1997, was their only number-one album.

Faith No More disbanded in 1998 and their first compilation album, Who Cares a Lot?, was released later on in the same year with their final single before their disbanding, a cover of the Bee Gees song "I Started a Joke", followed by their similarly named music video compilation Who Cares a Lot?: Greatest Videos. In 2003 their second compilation album, This Is It: The Best of, was released followed by Epic and Other Hits in 2005, The Platinum Collection and the DVD compilation You Fat Bastards/Who Cares a Lot? in 2006 and the three-disc compilation album The Works in 2008. Two more compilation albums, The Very Best Definitive Ultimate Greatest Hits Collection and Midlife Crisis: The Very Best of Faith No More, were released in 2009 and 2010 respectively.

After an eleven-year hiatus, Faith No More announced a reunion in 2009. They released their seventh studio album, Sol Invictus, which debuted at number 15 on the Billboard 200, higher than their past two studio albums, on May 18, 2015, and toured in support of it.

Albums

Studio albums

Live albums

Compilation albums

Video albums

Singles

Music videos

Other appearances

Notes

References

External links
Faith No More Discography.com
WWW.PATTONMAD.COM Comprehensive FNM Discography with Images
Faith No More discography on FNM.com
Faith No More at Discogs

Discography
Discographies of American artists
Rock music group discographies